Hydatellales is a botanical name for an order of flowering plants. In the Cronquist system, 1981, the name was used for an order placed in the subclass Commelinidae in class Liliopsida [=monocotyledons]. The order consisted of one family only:

 order Hydatellales
 family Hydatellaceae

Similarly the Dahlgren system recognised this order (with the same circumscription and placed it in superorder Commelinanae in subclass Liliidae [=monocotyledons].

The APG II system assigns these plants to the order Poales, close to the grasses and sedges. Recent study by Saarela et al., however, suggests a position out of the Poales; here, the Hydatellaceae link with the waterlilies, the first time a plant has been ejected from the monocots. The Angiosperm Phylogeny Website had since updated the Nymphaeales page to include the family.

References

Historically recognized angiosperm orders